James "Mac" Warren is a journalist and steel worker who ran as the Socialist Workers Party candidate for United States President in 1988 and 1992.  His running mate in 1988 was Kathleen Mickells, and in 1992 he had two: Estelle DeBates and Willie Mae Reid, varying from state to state. Warren and his running mates received 23,533 votes (0.02%) 

Warren also ran against incumbent Richard M. Daley for mayor of Chicago in 1991, receiving less than 1% of the vote.

Bibliography
 The National Black Independent Political Party: an Important Step forward for Blacks and other American Workers  (1981) (with Nan Bailey and Malik Miah)
 Independent Black Political Action 1954-1978: The Struggle to Break with the Democratic and Republican Parties (1982) )
 A Socialist View of the Chicago Election: Forging a Black-Latino-Labor Alliance (1983) (with Jon Hillson and Malik Miah)

Year of birth missing (living people)
Living people
African-American candidates for President of the United States
African-American people in Illinois politics
Socialist Workers Party (United States) presidential nominees
Candidates in the 1988 United States presidential election
Candidates in the 1992 United States presidential election
20th-century American politicians
Politicians from Chicago
20th-century African-American politicians
21st-century African-American people